Macromerine is a phenethylamine derivative. It was first identified from the cactus Coryphantha macromeris.  It can also be found in C. runyonii, C. elephantidens, and other related members of the family Cactaceae. The plants may have been used by Tarahumara shamans for their entheogenic effects.

Chemistry 
Macromerine is a phenethylamine derivative with the molecular formula C12H19NO3.

Effects 
At least one study found macromerine to be non-psychoactive, however as a phenethylamine derivative, it may be psychoactive.

See also 

 Phenethylamine cactus
 Mescaline

References

Phenethylamine alkaloids
Phenethylamines
Phenol ethers
Phenylethanolamines